Tessa Maud (born October 10, 2003) is an American professional snowboarder, specializing in half pipe. Maud was named to the US Team for the 2022 Winter Olympics, finishing 16th. She also competed in the 2020 Winter Youth Olympics, and has earned two silver medals at the Junior World Championships.

Early life 
At the age of seven, Maud joined the local Mammoth Mountain Snowboard Team (MMSST). Her parents are also avid snowboarders.

Career 
In 2021, she was named to the Team USA snowboarding Rookie Squad.

2022 Winter Olympics
On January 21, 2022, Team USA announced that she had been selected to represent the United States at the 2022 Winter Olympics in Beijing, China, her first Winter Olympics. She finished sixteenth in the women's halfpipe, missing qualifying for the finals, which required finishing in the top twelve. During the games, Maud praised the dining experiences she had in the country, stating that Chinese cuisine is "hands down the best she's ever had".

References

External links 

 
 Tessa Maud at U.S. Ski & Snowboard

2003 births
Living people
American female snowboarders
People from Mammoth Lakes, California
Sportspeople from California
Snowboarders at the 2022 Winter Olympics
Olympic snowboarders of the United States
21st-century American women
Snowboarders at the 2020 Winter Youth Olympics